Pandamonium is an amusement ride in the DreamWorks Experience area of Dreamworld on the Gold Coast, Australia. The Zamperla Air Race 6.4 ride is featured as one of Dreamworld's Big 9 Thrill Rides. As with the rest of the "Land of Awesomeness" area, the ride is themed to the Kung-Fu Panda films.

History
In mid-2011, the outgoing CEO of Dreamworld, Noel Dempsey, leaked Dreamworld's plans to team up with DreamWorks Animation on his LinkedIn profile page. On 10 November 2011, Dreamworld officially announced a three-stage plan to incorporate DreamWorks Animation films and characters into its theme park. The first phase was the DreamWorks Holiday Shrektacular Show which ran throughout the summer peak period, with the second being the retheming of Dreamworld's kids area into a  DreamWorks Experience precinct which opened in March 2012. The final phase announced was the development of an eating and meet-and-greet area called Kung Fu garden. Throughout 2012, the Kung Fu garden concept evolved into the Kung Fu Panda: Land of Awesomeness.

The construction of Kung Fu Panda: Land of Awesomeness began in July 2012 with the closure and demolition of Avalanche. On 3 September 2012, the Bumper Beach was closed to aid in construction. The park previously announced that additional rides and attractions would be added to the area in December 2012. The headline attraction would be Pandamonium which would be the park's 8th thrill ride. Other attractions included Skadoosh and Kung Fu Academy. Kung Fu Panda: Land of Awesomeness, along with Pandamonium, soft opened on 21 December 2012 with an official opening held on 26 December 2012.

Ardent Leisure, the owners of Dreamworld, added Pandamonium in an attempt to expand the park's ride inventory. Five months after the ride opened Ardent Leisure reported that Pandamonium, coupled with the rest of the DreamWorks Experience precinct and the return of Big Brother Australia, gave the park a "strong foundation for building future market share".

Characteristics
Pandamonium is one of Dreamworld's seven thrill rides alongside The Claw, The Gold Coaster, The Giant Drop, Mick Doohan's Motocoaster, Steel Taipan and Tail Spin. Dreamworld offers their virtual queuing system, Ride Express, for some of the most popular rides in the park, including Pandamonium.

Designed by Italian firm Zamperla, Pandamonium is a themed version of their Air Race 6.4 model. It consists of six vehicles themed as pulled rickshaws. Each vehicle holds four riders in two rows of two. Riders are secured by over-the-shoulder restraints.

Ride experience

Pandamonium offers two ride experiences with different intensity factors. The first cycle type is a thrill ride experience. The ride begins with the vehicles slowly rotating around a centre column in a similar style to an aerial carousel. Each vehicle begins to swing from side to side. This results in riders experiencing up to 3.8 times the force of gravity. The alternative experience is designed for kids and sees the ride vehicles swing from side to side whilst rotating around the central column. Both cycles last for 2 minutes and 30 seconds each.

References

External links
 
 Air Race at Zamperla's official website

Amusement rides introduced in 2012
Amusement rides manufactured by Zamperla
Dreamworld (Australia)